Frederick Evert Grafft (February 20, 1912 – August 13, 1993) was an American professional basketball player. He played in the National Basketball League for the Kankakee Gallagher Trojans during the 1937–38 season and averaged 8.6 point per game.

References 

1912 births
1993 deaths
American men's basketball players
United States Army personnel of World War II
Basketball players from Chicago
Guards (basketball)
Kankakee Gallagher Trojans players
People from Buena Vista County, Iowa
People from Sparta, Tennessee